The 1955 Finnish Cup was the 1st season of the main annual association football cup competition in Finland. It was organised as a single-elimination knock–out tournament and participation in the competition was voluntary.  The final was held at the Olympic Stadium, Helsinki on 20 November 1955 with Valkeakosken Haka defeating Helsingin Palloseura by 5-1 before an attendance of 3,021 spectators.

Round 1

Round 2

Quarter-finals

Semi-finals

Final

See also 
 1955 Mestaruussarja

References

External links
 Suomen Cup Official site 

Finnish Cup seasons
Fin
Cup